
Sarabaites were a kind of Christian monk widespread before the time of Benedict of Nursia. They were also known as remoboths.

History
They either continued like the early asceticism, to live in their own homes, or dwelt together in or near cities. They acknowledged no monastic superior, obeyed no definite rule, and disposed individually of the product of their manual labour.

Jerome speaks of them under the name remoboth, and John Cassian tells of their wide diffusion in Egypt and other lands. Both writers express a very unfavourable opinion concerning their conduct, and a reference to them in the Rule of Saint Benedict is of similar import.

At a later date, the name Sarabaites, the original meaning of which cannot be determined, designated in a general way degenerate monks. The Rule of St. Benedict considered their non-adherence to church canon only to be exceeded by the gyrovagues.

References

Works cited

See also
 Gyrovagues
 Rule of Saint Benedict

External links

 

Catholic orders and societies
Roman Catholic monks